Founded on December 7, 1946, the Lebanese Order of Physicians in Beirut is the largest medical organization and physician group in Lebanon. 
Its membership of 12,000 aims to pursue and promote optimal healthcare system and policies in Lebanon thus the region. Physicians are specialists who apply scientific knowledge and clinical expertise to the diagnosis, treatment, and compassionate care of adults across the spectrum from health to complex illness.

Role
The Lebanese Order of Physicians’ mission is a medical, healthy, scientific, administrative, and a guiding mission that aims to:

 Unify the doctors’ word, defend their rights, maintain their legitimate moral and material interests, raise the level of their profession, and ensure the ethics and dignity of the medical care.
 Discipline doctors to its laws and to the medical ethics.
 Express an opinion and make suggestions for laws and regulations related to the profession of medicine and health agreements.
 Express an opinion in sending medical missions and in attending international health conferences.
 Coordinate with government institutions, especially with the Ministries of Public Health and Environment, to take the correct and useful decisions in the issues related to public health, and the formulation of national health policies.
 Provide suggestions on the medical curriculum in colleges and institutes of medicine in Lebanon, and ensure the professional eligibility of physicians.
 Contribute along with local and international institutions to defend human rights in health issues.
 Coordinate with the Ministries of Public Health and Media on all matters related to public medical information and medical programs of any kind.
 Express an opinion in the organization of the professions of assistance in the field of medicine.
 Develop a manual on doctor fees.
 Seek to solve the disputes that might occur among physicians or between them and their patients.
 Help the doctors, or their families’, that are in need or with disabilities, and establish a retirement (pension) fund for aging and disability insurance.
 Put a self-health insurance for the medical entity, and establish a synergistic fund for this purpose.

Presidents

Branches
 Baalback
 Bekaa
 Jounieh
 Nabatieh
 Saida

Committees
Media & Communication Committee
 Dr. Laudy Abou Reda
 Dr. Wassim El Bitar
 Dr. Paula Karam
 Dr. Mohamad Mazraani
 Dr. Hachem Noureldine
 Dr. Richard Rizk
 Dr. Jean Claude Saab

Scientific Committee

Administrative Committee

References
 Role of the Order
 Charah Abou Charaf: The Order of Physicians... after half a century - From Pioneers.. to a promising future (1946-2013)

External links
 Official website

Organizations established in 1946
Medical and health organisations based in Lebanon